Ljungqvist is Swedish surname, which may refer to:

 Alexander Ljungqvist, Swedish economist
 Arne Ljungqvist (born 1931), Swedish medical researcher
 Ida Ljungqvist (born 1981), Tanzanian-Swedish model
 Lennart Ljungqvist (1931-1991), Swedish chess player
 Sture Ljungqvist (1921-2004), Swedish architect

Swedish-language surnames